The 1999 season was the seventh season of the J-League Division 1. The league began in March and ended in November.
For this year, the division was contested by 16 teams following the folding of Yokohama Flügels and the relegation of Consadole Sapporo to the newly formed Division 2. In a year dominated by Shizuoka Prefecture, Júbilo Iwata won the 1st stage with neighbours Shimizu S-Pulse winning the 2nd stage. Iwata won the J.League Division 1 title for the after triumphing on penalty kicks in the Suntory Championship.

Clubs
Following sixteen clubs participated in J.League Division 1 during 1999 season.

Overview

First stage

Second stage

Suntory Championship

Overall table

Awards
Most Valuable Player:  Alex (Shimizu S-Pulse)

References

1999
1
Japan
Japan